Steven Stretch (born 5 January 1964) is a former Australian rules footballer who played for Melbourne and Fitzroy in the VFL/AFL and West Torrens in the South Australian National Football League (SANFL).

A wingman, Stretch won the 1987 Keith 'Bluey' Truscott Trophy for the Demon's best and fairest player. Stretch also played in 13 finals for the Demons including the 1988 VFL Grand Final. In 1994 he was traded to Fitzroy in the pre-season draft and played his final two seasons at the club.

Steven's son Billy played for the Demons after being drafted in 2014 under the father-son rule.

Playing statistics

|- style="background-color: #EAEAEA"
! scope="row" style="text-align:center" | 1986
|style="text-align:center;"|
| 18 || 18 || 4 || 6 || 191 || 64 || 255 || 64 ||  || 0.2 || 0.3 || 10.6 || 3.6 || 14.2 || 3.6 || 
|-
! scope="row" style="text-align:center" | 1987
|style="text-align:center;"|
| 18 || 24 || 9 || 7 || 345 || 95 || 440 || 90 || 34 || 0.4 || 0.3 || 14.4 || 4.0 || 18.3 || 3.8 || 1.4
|- style="background:#eaeaea;"
! scope="row" style="text-align:center" | 1988
|style="text-align:center;"|
| 18 || 26 || 5 || 9 || 423 || 78 || 501 || 105 || 23 || 0.2 || 0.3 || 16.3 || 3.0 || 19.3 || 4.0 || 0.9
|-
! scope="row" style="text-align:center" | 1989
|style="text-align:center;"|
| 18 || 22 || 11 || 5 || 355 || 74 || 429 || 85 || 24 || 0.5 || 0.2 || 16.1 || 3.4 || 19.5 || 3.9 || 1.1
|- style="background:#eaeaea;"
! scope="row" style="text-align:center" | 1990
|style="text-align:center;"|
| 18 || 23 || 8 || 8 || 327 || 71 || 398 || 67 || 46 || 0.3 || 0.3 || 14.2 || 3.1 || 17.3 || 2.9 || 2.0
|-
! scope="row" style="text-align:center" | 1991
|style="text-align:center;"|
| 18 || 19 || 3 || 7 || 255 || 65 || 320 || 64 || 26 || 0.2 || 0.4 || 13.4 || 3.4 || 16.8 || 3.4 || 1.4
|- style="background:#eaeaea;"
! scope="row" style="text-align:center" | 1992
|style="text-align:center;"|
| 18 || 18 || 14 || 7 || 227 || 47 || 274 || 72 || 23 || 0.8 || 0.4 || 12.6 || 2.6 || 15.2 || 4.0 || 1.3
|-
! scope="row" style="text-align:center" | 1993
|style="text-align:center;"|
| 18 || 14 || 17 || 5 || 149 || 68 || 217 || 32 || 12 || 1.2 || 0.4 || 10.6 || 4.9 || 15.5 || 2.3 || 0.9
|- style="background:#eaeaea;"
! scope="row" style="text-align:center" | 1994
|style="text-align:center;"|
| 22 || 19 || 5 || 4 || 188 || 104 || 292 || 63 || 43 || 0.3 || 0.2 || 9.9 || 5.5 || 15.4 || 3.3 || 2.3
|-
! scope="row" style="text-align:center" | 1995
|style="text-align:center;"|
| 22 || 6 || 2 || 2 || 47 || 18 || 65 || 15 || 10 || 0.3 || 0.3 || 7.8 || 3.0 || 10.8 || 2.5 || 1.7
|- class="sortbottom"
! colspan=3| Career
! 189
! 78
! 60
! 2507
! 684
! 3191
! 657
! 241
! 0.4
! 0.3
! 13.3
! 3.6
! 16.9
! 3.5
! 1.4
|}

References

External links

1964 births
Living people
Australian rules footballers from South Australia
Melbourne Football Club players
Fitzroy Football Club players
West Torrens Football Club players
Keith 'Bluey' Truscott Trophy winners
South Australian State of Origin players